Patterson Creek is a  tributary of the North Branch Potomac River in West Virginia's Eastern Panhandle, in the United States. It enters the North Branch east of Cumberland, Maryland, with its headwaters located in Grant County, West Virginia. Patterson Creek is the watershed for two-thirds of Mineral County, West Virginia. The creek passes through Lahmansville, Forman, Medley, Williamsport, Burlington, Headsville, Reeses Mill, Champwood, and Fort Ashby.

History
The creek most likely was named after the local Patterson family. The place at which Patterson Creek joins the North Branch Potomac River was once known as Patterson Depot.

Tributaries
Mill Creek

Bridges

See also
Patterson Creek Cutoff
List of rivers of West Virginia

References

Rivers of Grant County, West Virginia
Rivers of Mineral County, West Virginia
Rivers of West Virginia
Tributaries of the Potomac River